Xigang may refer to the following locations:

Mainland China
Xigang District, Dalian, Liaoning
Xigang Road Subdistrict, Haigang District, Qinhuangdao, Hebei
Xigang, Hebei, town in Haigang District, Qinhuangdao, Hebei
Xigang, Jiangxi, town in Xiushui County, Jiangxi
Xigang, Shandong, town in Tengzhou, Shandong
Xigang Township, Fusong County, Jilin

Taiwan
Sigang District, alternately Xigang, district in Tainan